Carl Jan Olof "Olle" Nordin (born 23 November 1949) is a Swedish former football coach and former player. He represented IFK Norrköping, IFK Sundsvall, and IFK Göteborg during a playing career that spanned between 1970 and 1980. A full international between 1976 and 1979, he won 19 caps for the Sweden national team and represented his country at the 1978 FIFA World Cup. As a coach, he is best remembered for leading the Sweden national team at the 1990 FIFA World Cup, as well as for his stints with IFK Norrköping and AIK.

Playing career 
At the club level, Nordin represented IFK Norrköping, IFK Sundsvall, and IFK Göteborg. He was capped 19 times for the Sweden national team and played at the 1978 FIFA World Cup.

Coaching career 
As national team coach, Nordin led Sweden to the 1990 FIFA World Cup — its first World Cup since Nordin participated as a player. The tournament was a failure, however, as Sweden lost all three matches with 1–2. Nordin was fired shortly thereafter. He managed Norwegian clubs (Vålerenga, Lyn) as well as Swedish Västra Frölunda IF, IFK Norrköping and AIK.

The latest club he managed was IFK Malmö in 2016.

Career statistics

International 

 Scores and results list Sweden's goal tally first, score column indicates score after each Nordin goal.

References

1949 births
Living people
People from Älmhult Municipality
Swedish footballers
Sweden international footballers
1978 FIFA World Cup players
IFK Göteborg players
IFK Sundsvall players
IFK Norrköping players
Association football midfielders
Swedish football managers
Västra Frölunda IF managers
Vålerenga Fotball managers
Sweden national football team managers
1990 FIFA World Cup managers
Lyn Fotball managers
Al-Wasl F.C. managers
IFK Norrköping managers
AIK Fotboll managers
Jönköpings Södra IF managers
IFK Malmö Fotboll managers
Swedish expatriate football managers
Swedish expatriate sportspeople in Norway
Expatriate football managers in Norway
Swedish expatriate sportspeople in the United Arab Emirates
Expatriate football managers in the United Arab Emirates
Sportspeople from Kronoberg County